The 1909–10 Bradford City A.F.C. season was the seventh in the club's history.

The club finished 7th in Division One, and reached the 2nd round of the FA Cup.

Sources

References

Bradford City A.F.C. seasons
Bradford City